O'Brien (known as O'Connor in the 1956 film adaptation of the novel) is a fictional character and the main antagonist in George Orwell's 1949 novel Nineteen Eighty-Four. The protagonist Winston Smith, living in a dystopian society governed by the Party, feels strangely drawn to Inner Party member O'Brien. Orwell never reveals O'Brien's first name. The name indicates that O'Brien is of Irish origin, but this background is never shown to have any significance.

Overview 

O'Brien is a member of the Inner Party and, like Winston Smith, works in the Ministry of Truth. There, he holds an administrative position that is so distant that Winston has only a vague idea of its nature.
Winston suspects that O'Brien secretly opposes the Party. Eventually O'Brien approaches Winston with some leading remarks which seem to confirm Winston's suspicions. Winston finds the courage to approach him candidly, declaring himself an enemy of the totalitarian state. At first, Winston's intuition seems to be correct: O'Brien presents himself as a member of the "Brotherhood" seeking to overthrow the Party and Ingsoc. O'Brien invites Winston (who then invites Julia) to his flat where, as a member of the Inner Party he lives in comparative luxury. Like Winston and Julia, O'Brien is not unfamiliar with smoking and drinking. However, as an Inner Party member, he has access to far better cigarettes and other goods than they do. Whilst visiting O'Brien at his home, Winston samples wine for the first time. O’Brien then extracts a series of pledges from the couple that they are prepared to do anything to serve the Brotherhood, except (at Julia's protest) to separate from each other.

In truth, O'Brien is an agent of the Thought Police, and is completely loyal to the Party and to Ingsoc.  He is part of a false flag resistance movement whose goal is to find thought-criminals (anyone who has ideas deemed to be unacceptable by the Party), lure them in by pretending to be on their side, then arrest and help them to become sane.

O'Brien is next seen after Winston is arrested by the Thought Police. He reveals himself as he enters the cell by responding to Winston's exclamation, "They've got you too!", by commenting, "They got me a long time ago."

O'Brien is estimated privately by Winston as being 48–50 years old (O'Brien notices and guesses that Winston is contemplating this despite him not speaking of it). This would mean that he was born about 1934 to 1936, that he was a young man at the time of the Revolution which brought the Party to power, and that unlike Winston he clearly remembers the world as it was before - though he does not share these reminiscences with his prisoner (except for demonstrating that he knows the full text of "Oranges and Lemons").

Over several weeks, O'Brien tortures Winston to cure him of his "insanity", in particular his "false" notion that there exists a past and an external, self-evident reality independent of the Party; O'Brien explains that reality only exists within the human mind, and since the Party controls everyone's mind, it therefore controls reality.

He is entirely honest about the brutal cynicism of the Party; the Party does not seek power to benefit themselves or their subjects, but simply to revel in that power: "Always, Winston, at every moment, there will be the thrill of victory, the sensation of trampling on an enemy who is helpless. If you want a picture of the future, imagine a boot stamping on a human face—forever."

Even in the torture scenes, there is a strange intimacy that persists between Winston and O'Brien. O'Brien even states that Winston's mind appeals to him, and that it resembles his own mind, except that Winston happens to be "insane". Eventually, in Room 101, O'Brien tortures Winston into submission so that he willingly embraces the philosophy of the Party.

Inspirations 

O'Brien was partly inspired by the character of Gletkin from Arthur Koestler's novel Darkness at Noon. The two characters share many common traits, including their ruthlessness and fanaticism to the government: O'Brien however is more sadistic than the cold, detached Gletkin, and prefers to use torture himself, whereas Gletkin prefers to torment his prisoners psychologically. The torture scenes (undertaken by O'Brien) were influenced in part by the stories leaked out of the USSR of the punishments inflicted on political prisoners in mental hospitals and the Gulag.

The choice of the clearly Irish surname is regarded as a reference to Brendan Bracken, under whom Orwell worked during the war creating propaganda, and whom Orwell detested. In what has been described as "one of the strangest coincidences in literature", it was revealed in 2003 that O'Brien was the codename of NKVD agent Hugh O'Donnell, who received reports on the author from his subordinate David Crook when Crook spied on Orwell during the Spanish Civil War.

Portrayals 

Canadian actor Lorne Greene played O'Brien in a 1953 adaptation on the CBS anthology series Studio One (S06E01) called "1984". In the adaptation broadcast on 26 April 1953 on The United States Steel Hour radio program, Alan Hewitt played O'Brien. In the BBC Television adaptation of Nineteen Eighty-Four (1954), the character was played by André Morell. In the 2013 BBC Radio 3 adaptation, O'Brien was played by Tim Pigott-Smith.

In the 1956 film, O'Brien was renamed O'Connor, possibly to avoid confusion with Edmond O'Brien, who portrayed Winston. O'Connor was played by Michael Redgrave. In the 1984 film version, O'Brien was portrayed by Richard Burton in his final role.

The character of Corbin O'Brian in the film Snowden (2016) is thought to have been inspired by Orwell's O'Brien.

References 

Nineteen Eighty-Four characters
Fictional prison officers and governors
Fictional British police officers
Literary characters introduced in 1949
Fictional writers
Fictional torturers
Fictional British people
Male characters in literature
Male literary villains